Patricia Hawkins-Williams (born October 23, 1965) is an American politician who has served in the Florida House of Representatives from the 92nd district since 2016.

References

1965 births
Living people
Democratic Party members of the Florida House of Representatives
Women state legislators in Florida
21st-century American politicians
21st-century American women politicians
Politicians from Fort Lauderdale, Florida